Socialist Workers' Current is a far-left Trotskyist political organisation in Brazil, created in 1992 by a split of the Socialist Convergence. CST is an active tendency of the Socialism and Liberty Party (PSOL) and the Brazilian section of the International Workers' Unity – Fourth International. CST split from Worker's Party (PT) when its federal deputy Babá was expelled from PT, after voting against the pension reform proposed by ex-president Lula. 
Among the largest currents in PSOL, CST is the most leftist tendency.

References

External links
Socialist Workers' Current (CST-PSOL)
International Workers' Unity – Fourth International (IWU-FI)
1992 establishments in Brazil
Far-left politics in Brazil
Organizations established in 1992
Socialism and Liberty Party
Trotskyist organisations in Brazil
Far-left political parties
International Workers' Unity – Fourth International